Gambrinus is a genus of click beetles in the family Elateridae, most of which were formerly included in the genus Limonius.

North American Species

Selected Old World species
 Gambrinus violaceus (Müller, 1821)

References

Elateridae
Elateridae genera